Conscious is the state or quality of awareness.

Conscious may also refer to:

 Conscious (Broods album), 2016 
 Conscious (Guy Sebastian album), 2017
 "Conscious" (Guy Sebastian song)
 "Conscious" (Alias episode)

See also
 Consciousness (disambiguation)